Ruthiromia is an extinct genus of varanopid synapsids from the Early Permian of the United States.

See also

 List of pelycosaurs

References 

 Eberth, D. A. & Brinkman, D. 1983. Ruthiromia elcobriensis, a new pelycosaur from El Cobre Canyon, New Mexico. Breviora 474: 1-27.

Varanopids
Prehistoric synapsid genera
Cisuralian synapsids of North America
Fossil taxa described in 1983
Cisuralian genus first appearances
Cisuralian genus extinctions